Fake election may refer to:

A mock election, held for educational purposes or for parody purposes
An election with a high degree of electoral fraud